George Fredrick Bourne (5 March 1932 – 7 October 2004) was an English footballer who played in the Football League for Stoke City.

Career
Bourne was an amateur at local club Burslem Albion before he signed a professional contract at Stoke City. He transferred from a centre forward into a defender and became a useful player in the Second Division however after exactly 100 League appearances Bourne suffered a badly broken leg and consequently had to retire. The club paid him £855 in compensation and also gave him a Testimonial match in 1957. He later ran his own window cleaning business before his death in 2004.

Career statistics

References

External links
 

English footballers
Stoke City F.C. players
English Football League players
1929 births
2004 deaths
Association football defenders